Aurelia aurita (also called the common jellyfish, moon jellyfish, moon jelly or saucer jelly) is a species of the genus Aurelia. All species in the genus are very similar, and it is difficult to identify Aurelia medusae without genetic sampling; most of what follows applies equally to all species of the genus. The most common method used to identify the species consists of selecting a jellyfish from a harbour using a device, usually a drinking glass and then photographing the subject. This means that they can be released in to the harbour shortly afterwards and return to their natural habitat.

It feeds by collecting medusae, plankton, and mollusks with its tentacles, and bringing them into its body for digestion. It is capable of only limited motion, and drifts with the current, even when swimming.

Distribution 
The species Aurelia aurita is found in the North, Black, Baltic and Caspian Seas, Northeast Atlantic, Greenland, northeastern USA and Canada, Northwest Pacific and South America. In general, Aurelia is an inshore genus that can be found in estuaries and harbors.

It prefers temperate seas with consistent currents. It has been found in waters with salinity as low as 6 parts per thousand.
The relation between summer hypoxia and moon jellyfish distribution is prominent during the summer months of July and August where temperatures are high and dissolved oxygen (DO) is low. Of the three environmental conditions tested, bottom DO has the most significant effect on moon jellyfish abundance. Moon jellyfish abundance is the highest when bottom dissolved oxygen concentration is lower than 2.0 mg L−1. Moon jellyfish show a strong tolerance to low DO conditions, which is why their population is still relatively high during the summer. Generally, hypoxia causes species to move from the oxygen depleted zone, but this is not the case for the moon jellyfish. Furthermore, bell contract rate, which indicates moon jellyfish feeding activity, remains constant although DO concentrations are lower than normal. During July and August it is observed that moon jellyfish aggregations of 250 individuals consumed an estimated 100% of the mesozooplankton biomass in the Seto Inland Sea. Other major fish predators that are also present in these coastal waters do not seem to show the same high tolerance to low DO concentrations that the moon jellyfish exhibit. The feeding and predatory performance of these fish significantly decreases when DO concentrations are so low. This allows for less competition between the moon jellyfish and other fish predators for zooplankton. Low DO concentrations in the coastal waters such as the Tokyo Bay in Japan and Seto Inland Sea prove to be advantageous for the moon jellyfish in terms of feeding, growth, and survival.

Feeding 
Aurelia aurita and other Aurelia species feed on plankton that includes organisms such as mollusks, crustaceans, tunicate larvae, rotifers, young polychaetes, protozoans, diatoms, eggs, fish eggs, and other small organisms. Occasionally, they are also seen feeding on gelatinous zooplankton such as hydromedusae and ctenophores. Both the adult medusae and larvae of Aurelia have nematocysts to capture prey and also to protect themselves from predators.

The food is caught with its nematocyst-laden tentacles, tied with mucus, brought to the gastrovascular cavity, and passed into the cavity by ciliated action. There, digestive enzymes from serous cell break down the food. Little is known about the requirements for particular vitamins and minerals, but due to the presence of some digestive enzymes, we can deduce in general that A. aurita can process carbohydrates, proteins and lipids.

Body system 

Aurelia does not have respiratory parts such as gills, lungs or trachea; it respires by diffusing oxygen from water through the thin membrane covering its body. Within the gastrovascular cavity, low oxygenated water can be expelled and high oxygenated water can come in by ciliated action, thus increasing the diffusion of oxygen through cell. The large surface area membrane to volume ratio helps Aurelia to diffuse more oxygen and nutrients into the cells.

The basic body plan of Aurelia consists of several parts. The animal lacks respiratory, excretory, and circulatory systems. The adult medusa of Aurelia, with a transparent look, has an umbrella margin membrane and tentacles that are attached to the bottom. It has four bright gonads that are under the stomach. Food travels through the muscular manubrium while the radial canals help disperse the food. There is a middle layer of mesoglea, gastrodervascular cavity with gastrodermis, and epidermis. There is a nerve net that is responsible for contractions in swimming muscles and feeding responses.

The medusae are either male or female. The young larval stage, a planula, has small ciliated cells and after swimming freely in the plankton for a day or more, settles on an appropriate substrate, where it changes into a special type of polyp called a "scyphistoma", which divides by strobilation into small ephyrae that swim off to grow up as medusae. There is an increasing size from starting stage planula to ephyra, from less than 1 mm in the planula stage, up to about 1 cm in ephyra stage, and then to several cm in diameter in the medusa stage.

A recent study has found that A. aurita are capable of lifecycle reversal where individuals grow younger instead of older, akin to the "immortal jellyfish" Turritopsis dohrnii.

There has been a study presenting that Aurelias body system isn't significantly affected by artificial materials like microbeads, which can be found in cosmetic and personal care products. Aurelia aurita was able to recognize that microbeads were not food so there wasn't any physiological or histological harm.

Predators 

Aurelia aurita have high proportions of polyunsaturated fatty acids comparative to other prey types which provides vital nutritions to predators. Aurelia aurita are known to be eaten by a wide variety of predators, including the ocean sunfish (Mola mola), the leatherback sea turtle (Dermochelys coriacea), the scyphomedusa Phacellophora camtschatica, and a very large hydromedusa (Aequorea victoria). Recently it was reported from the Red Sea that Aurelia aurita was seasonally preyed upon by two herbivorous fish. Moon jellies are also fed upon by sea birds, which may be more interested in the amphipods and other small arthropods that frequent the bells of Aurelia, but in any case, birds do some substantial amount of damage to these jellyfish that often are found just at the surface of bays.

Aurelia jellyfish naturally die after living and reproducing for several months. It is probably rare for these moon jellies to live more than about six months in the wild, although specimens cared for in public aquarium exhibits typically live several to many years. In the wild, the warm water at the end of summer combines with exhaustive daily reproduction and lower natural levels of food for tissue repair, leaving these jellyfish more susceptible to bacterial and other disease problems that likely lead to the demise of most individuals. Such problems are responsible for the demise of many smaller species of jellyfish. In 1997, Arai summarized that seasonal reproduction leaves the gonads open to infection and degradation.

Some metazoan parasites attack Aurelia aurita, as well as most other species of jellyfish.

Gallery

References

Further reading

External links 
 
 
 

aurita
Cnidarians of the Atlantic Ocean
Marine fauna of Europe
Marine fauna of North America
Fauna of Canada
Invertebrates of the United States
Animals described in 1758
Taxa named by Carl Linnaeus
Articles containing video clips